The Pact of El Pardo was an informal agreement which supposedly took place on 24 November, 1885, in the face of King Alfonso XII's imminent death. It established a system of party alternation that lasted until General Primo de Rivera's coup in 1923. The pact was signed in the Royal Palace of El Pardo.

Historical context 

The pact was signed between Antonio Cánovas del Castillo, leader of the Conservative Party, and Práxedes Mateo Sagasta, leader of the Liberal Party. Both political parties dominated Spanish politics during the Restoration period. The aim of the pact was to provide stability to the regime, which was thought to be in jeopardy due to the proximity of the King's death. The pact established a system of alternance for the two major political parties, effectively ensuring that both would "take turns" governing the country within a democratic framework. This was achieved through the use of caciques, powerful individuals who greatly influenced the vote around their area. The pact also served the purpose of integrating into the system the political groups that were marginalized by the 1875 Restoration. Some sources claim that such a pact was never formalized, in the sense that there was no agreement for both parties to "take turns" to govern the country. Instead, it was merely a meeting between the two major leaders in which they both recognized the necessity of a will to achieve consensus in a critical juncture for the country's political destiny. The meeting between Cánovas and Sagasta was concerted by General Arsenio Martínez Campos.

References 

Restoration (Spain)
1880s in Spain
Political history of Spain
Elections in Spain
Electoral fraud